Murabba (from ) refers to a sweet fruit preserve which is popular in many regions of South Caucasus, Central Asia, South Asia, and the Middle East. It is generally prepared with fruits, sugar, and spices.

Popular fruits that are candied are apple, apricot, gooseberry (amla), mango, plum, quince, and winter melon.

Gallery

References

External links
Thank Mughal love for fruit for Murabbas popularity in India at Scroll.in

Nepalese cuisine
Gujarati cuisine
Indian pickles
Fruit dishes